The Story of a Recluse has been the title of at least three works of fiction.

The first, an unfinished tale by Robert Louis Stevenson, tells the story of Jamie Kirkwood, an Edinburgh minister's son who finds himself waking up in a room identical to his own in the house of a mysterious man called Manton Jamieson.

This formed the basis of a second work, a television play by Alasdair Gray.  Written in 1985, the TV screenplay completes the original story by means of flashbacks from the 1930s. Gray then adapted this into yet another form, a short story in Lean Tales—the third incarnation of the title.  It involved some alterations to the television play's plot, concentrating for the most part on a metafictional discussion of the reasoning by which Gray deduces how Stevenson's story should end.

Novels by Robert Louis Stevenson
19th-century British novels
Unfinished novels
British novels adapted into plays